Yoopa (stylized YOOPA) is a Canadian French language specialty channel owned by Groupe TVA, a division of Quebecor Media. Initially aimed at preschoolers, Yoopa now broadcasts programming targeted toward children, aged 2–11.

A magazine for parents using the Yoopa name was launched on April 1, 2010 in conjunction with the launch of the television channel. The magazine replaced EspaceParents.ca, owned by TVA Publications, a division of Groupe TVA.

History
In February 2010, TVA Group was granted approval by the Canadian Radio-television and Telecommunications Commission (CRTC) to launch a television channel called TVA Junior, described as "a national French-language Category 2 specialty programming undertaking aimed exclusively at children from two to six years old."

The channel was launched on April 1, 2010 in as Yoopa.

Dispute with Vrak.TV Junior
Before Yoopa's launch and its approval by the CRTC, fellow broadcaster Astral Media had been approved for a similar channel in March 2006 called Vrak.TV Junior. Prior to its launch, Astral Media claimed that it had secured carriage on a number of other television providers, except Vidéotron — who has a hold of 51% of the Quebec market, the largest French market in Canada — owned by Quebecor Media, the parent of TVA Group. Astral claimed Vidéotron's refusal to carry the channel was to avoid competition for its upcoming channel, Yoopa. Astral attributed the delay in the launch of Vrak Junior to Vidéotron's refusal to carry the channel. Vidéotron categorically denied the accusation.

Vrak.TV Junior was launched on July 5, 2010 as Playhouse Disney Télé (now Télémagino) on Bell Satellite TV. Vidéotron launched the channel on March 1, 2011.

Current programming

 44 Cats
 L'académie secrète
 The Adventures of Chuck and Friends
 Abby Hatcher
 Ask the StoryBots
 The Adventures of Paddington
 Annie Brocoli autour du monde
 Alvinnn!!! and the Chipmunks
 Les Astucieux
 Boj
 Blue's Clues & You!
 Ben & Holly's Little Kingdom
 Bouli
 Bouiing
 Blaze and the Monster Machines
 Boy Girl Dog Cat Mouse Cheese
 Bubble Guppies
 La cabane à histoires
 Care Bears: Unlock the Magic
 Cars Toons
 Cars on the Road
 The Cat in the Hat Knows a Lot About That!
 Curious George
 Corn & Peg
 Dino Dan
 Dino Dana
 Daisy & Ollie
 Deer Squad The Doozers Drôles de bettes Dora and Friends: Into the City! Doki Dino Ranch Esme & Roy Floogals Fresh Beat Band of Spies La fée coquillette Les étoiles de Fred Littlest Pet Shop 
 The Little Mermaid 
 Les étoiles du dodo Hank Zipzer Henry Danger It's Pony Julius Jr. Kung Fu Panda: Legends of Awesomeness Kangaroo Beach Lazytown Miam! Miss Moon Mecha Builders Miss Zazie Middlemost Post My Big Big Friend My Little Pony: Friendship is Magic Nella the Princess Knight The Octonauts The Other Kingdom Percy's Tiger Tales Peppa Pig Rusty Rivets Ruff-Ruff, Tweet and Dave Ricky Zoom Shaun the Sheep Silver Spoons 
 Santiago of the Seas T'es où Théo? Team Umizoomi Topsy and Tim Transformers: Rescue Bots Academy True and the Rainbow Kingdom Timmy Time Thomas & Friends Thomas & Friends: All Engines Go Tree Fu Tom The Tales of Wonder Keepers Trip and Troop Wow! Wow! Wubbzy! YaYa and Zouk Yétili Zack Storm: Super pirate Zoom the White Dolphin''

Future programming

Former programming

International distribution
 Saint Pierre and Miquelon (French overseas collectivity) - distributed on the SPM Telecom system.

References

External links
  

Digital cable television networks in Canada
French-language television networks in Canada
Television channels and stations established in 2010
Children's television networks in Canada
Commercial-free television networks
Preschool education television networks